A Girl Like Me: The Gwen Araujo Story is a 2006 American biographical drama television film directed by  Agnieszka Holland and starring J. D. Pardo, Mercedes Ruehl, and Avan Jogia. It premiered on Lifetime in the United States on June 19, 2006. The film dramatizes the events surrounding the 2002 murder of Gwen Araujo, a transgender teenager who was murdered after acquaintances discovered that she had male genitalia.

In 2007, the film won the GLAAD Media Award for Outstanding Television Movie or Mini-series at the 18th GLAAD Media Awards.

Plot
Sylvia Guerrero is a young single mother looking to make a fresh start for her three young children. Having escaped an abusive relationship at the hands of the children's father, Sylvia has moved back home to California to live closer to her tight-knit Latin American family. Her father's birthday party is the first big family gathering since her return, and when she arrives, she encounters mixed reactions about her decision to leave her husband. After dinner, the children at the party decide to play a prank by putting Sylvia's son Eddie in a frilly pink dress. Eddie and the other children stand smiling, the adults at the party appear unamused and some look on with disdain.

The film alternates between the family's story and the future trial of two men charged with Gwen's murder. As the prosecutor's witness, a medical examiner testifies that the victim was beaten, strangled, wrapped in a shower curtain, and dumped in the woods. When asked about the victim's gender, she states, “it was that of a normally developed male”.

After the party, Sylvia's sister confronts her about the incident with the dress. Sylvia denies that it is an issue and tells her that Eddie is the best-behaved of all her children. Sylvia says that she is more worried about finding a job to support her children than she is about the fact that Eddie is a little bit different from other seven-year-old boys. Several days later, Sylvia comes home to celebrate her success at getting a job, and finds Eddie wearing a bra and makeup. Her older daughter Chita insists that it is just a game, but Sylvia makes Eddie promise that it will not happen again.

The movie cuts forward and Eddie is now a teenager, starting his first day at a new high school. Although Sylvia encourages her child to act “normal”, after he is dropped off, Eddie makes a last-minute decision to wear lipstick. When Sylvia realizes what has happened, the two have an intense fight and Sylvia begins removing all the traditionally female items from Eddie's room. However, after talking to a counselor at the Gender Identity Project and coming home to find Eddie in tears over being “a freak”, Sylvia has a moment of acceptance and tells Eddie that they need to get him waterproof mascara. At school, a friendly girl named Lisa White compliments Eddie's makeup, and he introduces himself as Gwen for the first time.
 
At the trial, the defense attorney asks Lisa questions about Gwen. He strongly implies that she was sexually promiscuous and into drugs at the time of her death, which Lisa vehemently denies. Lisa describes herself as Gwen's best friend and constantly corrects the defense attorney when he refers to Gwen using the incorrect pronouns.

Basking in her now openly expressed gender identity, Gwen grows out her hair and wears a dress to Chita's wedding, which shocks and displeases her extended family. At the wedding, she meets Joey Marino, a former Marine who is new to the area. The two hit it off and eventually begin dating. Worried about the relationship, Sylvia eventually outs Gwen to Joey, who breaks things off. Distraught, Gwen agrees to go to a party with Tamara, a female friend of Joey's. The next morning Gwen's aunt wakes up to find her passed out on the front lawn. Jealous that the group of boys at the party paid so much attention to Gwen, Tamara begins to suggest that Gwen is actually a male. The group makes a plan to find out the truth. Tamara lures Gwen to another party, promising that Joey will be there. When Gwen arrives, one of the boys forces her into a closet and pulls down her pants, discovering that she has male genitalia. The boys' initial shock quickly turns to rage, and they begin to viciously beat Gwen to death. Tamara realizes what she's done and screams for the boys to stop.  She is told to leave.  She leaves crying and ashamed for what she did. Sylvia immediately reports Gwen missing, and when her body is found, the entire family comes together to pay their respects, even in the face of protesters picketing the funeral.

In the final scene of the trial, the defense attempts to blame society for the boys’ actions, saying that discovering Gwen's biological sex challenged their sexual identity in a way that made them “go crazy”.  On the witness stand, Sylvia rejects this idea completely, telling the courtroom that the killers’ decision to take her daughter’s life  from her was theirs alone and that she blames them every day of her life; the boys to become remorseful as a result of her words. As Sylvia walks out of the courtroom, the people observing the trial begin to clap.

Cast

 J. D. Pardo as Gwen Araujo
 Mercedes Ruehl as Sylvia Guerrero
 Leela Savasta as Chita Araujo
 Avan Jogia as Danny Araujo
 Lupe Ontiveros as Mami
 Henry Darrow as Papi
 Corey Stoll as Joey Marino
 Vanesa Tomasino as Tamara Jones
 Greyston Holt as Jaron Nabors
 Nolan Gerard Funk as Michael Magidson
 Neil Denis as Jose Merel
 Jorge Vargas as Jason Cazares
 Ivan De Leon as Berto
 Nicole Muñoz as Chita Araujo (age 10)
 Michael Dillman as Eddie Araujo (age 7)

See also

 Boys Don't Cry (1999)
 Soldier's Girl (2003)
 Transgender in film and television
 Trans bashing
 Transphobia
 Intersectionality

References

External links
  
 

2006 biographical drama films
2006 LGBT-related films
2006 television films
2006 films
2000s English-language films
American biographical drama films
American drama television films
American LGBT-related television films
Biographical films about LGBT people
Biographical television films
Crime films based on actual events
Films about murder
Films about trans women
Films directed by Agnieszka Holland
Films set in the San Francisco Bay Area
LGBT-related drama films
Lifetime (TV network) films
Newark, California
Violence against trans women
2000s American films